Alfred L. Swart was a member of the Wisconsin State Assembly in 1883, representing the 2nd District of Sheboygan County, Wisconsin. He was a Democrat. Swart was born on June 11, 1840 in Florida, Montgomery County, New York.

References

People from Florida, Montgomery County, New York
People from Sheboygan County, Wisconsin
Democratic Party members of the Wisconsin State Assembly
1840 births
Year of death missing